The 1993–94 season was the 84th year of football played by Dundee United, and covers the period from 1 July 1993 to 30 June 1994. United finished in sixth place but the season will be remembered for the club's first Scottish Cup win, after Ivan Golac guided the club to success in his first season.

Season review
The club began the season without Duncan Ferguson, selling him to Rangers for a British transfer record of £4m. Replacing him up front was Craig Brewster, signed from Raith Rovers for a more modest £0.25m.

The club endured replays in most rounds of the Scottish Cup before beating Rangers to win the trophy at the seventh attempt.

Match results
Dundee United played a total of 58 competitive matches during the 1993–94 season. The team finished sixth in the Scottish Premier Division.

In the cup competitions, United won the Scottish Cup for the first time, beating Rangers 1-0 and qualifying for the following season's UEFA Cup Winners' Cup competition in the process. The club lost narrowly in the League Cup semi-final to Hibernian and lost on away goals to Brøndby in the UEFA Cup first round.

Legend

All results are written with Dundee United's score first.

Premier Division

Tennent's Scottish Cup

League Cup

UEFA Cup

Player details
During the 1993–94 season, United used 25 different players comprising five nationalities, with a further six named as unused substitutes. The table below shows the number of appearances and goals scored by each player.

|}

Goalscorers
United had 14 players score with the team scoring 66 goals in total. The top goalscorer was Craig Brewster, who finished the season with 20 goals.

Discipline
During the 1993–94 season, two United players were sent off. Statistics for cautions are unavailable.

Team statistics

League table

Transfers

In
The club signed four players during the season, as well as loaning one for the latter part. Only one player - Stevie Crawford - was signed for a fee (£80k).

Loans in

Out
Seven players were released by the club during the season. Four players were also loaned with Andy McLaren going on loan twice to different clubs.

Loans out

Playing kit

The jerseys were not sponsored, although Rover started next season's deal early in time for the Cup Final.

Trivia
United's highest home league attendance was on the first day of the season (against Aberdeen) and the lowest was on the final day (against Raith).

See also
1993–94 in Scottish football

References

External links
Glenrothes Arabs 1993–94 season review

Dundee United F.C. seasons
Dundee United